Beloha is a town in Androy Region, Madagascar. It is situated along the unpaved Route nationale 10.

Androy